European Parliament elections were held in Greece on 13 June 1999 to elect the 25 Greek members to the European Parliament. Members were elected by party-list proportional representation with a 3% threshold for any party.

Results
The 1999 European election was the fifth election to the European Parliament. The opposition conservative New Democracy party made gains as did the Communist Party of Greece, while the ruling PASOK lost ground.  Two parties on the left, the relatively new Democratic Social Movement and the Coalition of the Left and Progress elected two MEPs each. Political Spring, which had elected 2 MEPs in 1994, was unsuccessful in passing the 3% threshold and did not elect any members.

References

Greece
European Parliament elections in Greece
Europe
1990s in Greek politics